Bullet in the Flesh is a 1964 Spaghetti Western film directed by Marino Girolami.

Plot
Problems develop when a lumber baron Nathaniel Master's daughter Mabel falls in love with the Indian chief of the Cherokees whose land he wants to steal.

Cast
Rod Cameron as Nathaniel Masters
Patricia Viterbo as Mabel Masters
Ennio Girolami as Sam Masters
Bruno Piergentili as Chata
Manuel Zarzo as Nelson Masters
Consalvo Dell'Arti as judge
Dante Maggio as Bob Raskin
Enzo Maggio as client
Carla Calò as Peggy
Alfredo Mayo as Mortimer Lasky
Piero Lulli as Jonathan
Tota Alba as Minnie

Production
Bullet in the Flesh'''s screenplay and story were created by Gino De Santis De Santis' story differed from other European Western's released between 1964 and 1966 which usually depicted cavalry heroes and Indian villains with author Kevin Grant stated that they "showed little interest in Native Americans as people." Grant stated that De Santis's story was a rare exception from the period where it was sympathetic towards the Cherokee tribe whose woodland idyll is under threat from a bigoted white logging family.

ReleaseBullet in the Flesh'' was first distributed in 1964. It was distributed by Panta Cinematografica in Italy.

References

Sources

External links
 

1964 films
French Western (genre) films
Spanish Western (genre) films
Italian Western (genre) films
1964 Western (genre) films
Spaghetti Western films
Films directed by Marino Girolami
Films scored by Carlo Savina
1960s Italian films
1960s French films